The 2014 Boys' Youth South American Volleyball Championship was the 19th edition of the competition, organised by South America's governing volleyball body, the Confederación Sudamericana de Voleibol (CSV). It was held in Paipa, Colombia. The top two teams qualified for the 2015 FIVB Boys Youth World Championship.

First round

|}

|}

Final round

Classification 3-4

|}

Final

|}

Final standing

All-Star Team

Most Valuable Player

Best Setter

Best Opposite

Best Outside Hitters

 

Best Middle Blockers

Best Libero

References

External links
CSV official website

Men's South American Volleyball Championships
S
V
2014 in Colombian sport